Dolichoderus longipilosus is an extinct species of Eocene ant in the genus Dolichoderus. It was described by Dlussky in 2002, and the fossils of the species are only known from a fossilised worker that was found in the Baltic amber.

References

†
Prehistoric insects of Europe
Fossil taxa described in 2002
Fossil ant taxa
Rovno amber